This list of golf courses in North Dakota in the U.S. state of North Dakota.

Golf courses in North Dakota

 Apple Creek Country Club – Bismarck
 Apple Grove Grove Golf Course – Minot
 Birchwood Golf Course – Lake Metigoshe – Bottineau(Closed)
 Black Sands Golf Course – Beulah
 Bois de Sioux Golf Course – Wahpeton and Breckenridge, Minnesota
 Bully Pulpit Golf Course – Medora
 Cooperstown Country Club – Cooperstown
 Crossroads Golf Club – Carrington
 Devils Lake Town and Country Club – Devils Lake
 Eagle Ridge Golf Club – Williston
 Edgewater Country Club – New Town
 Edgewood Golf Course – Fargo
 Ellendale Country Club – Ellendale
 El Zagal Golf Course - Fargo
 Fair Oakes Golf Club – Grafton
 Fargo Country Club – Fargo
 Garrison Golf Course – Garrison
 Goose River Golf Club – Hillsboro
 Grand Forks Country Club – Grand Forks
 Harvey Country Club – Harvey
 Hawktree Golf Club – Bismarck
 Heart River Golf Course – Dickinson
 Hettinger Country Club – Hettinger
 Hillcrest Country Club – Park River
 Jamestown Country Club – Jamestown
 King's Walk Golf Course – Grand Forks
 LaMoure Memorial Golf Club – Pembina
 Leonard Country Club - Leonard
 Links of North Dakota at Red Mike Resort – Williston
 Linton Country Club – Linton
 Mandan Municipal Golf Course – Mandan
 Maple River Golf Club, Inc. – Mapleton
 Memorial Park Country Club – LaMoure
 Minot Country Club – Minot
 Napoleon Country Club – Napoleon
 North Portal Golf Course – Portal
 Osgood Golf Course – Fargo
 Oxbow Golf and Country Club – Oxbow
 Pebble Creek Golf Course – Bismarck
 Pheasant Country Golf Course – South Heart
 Prairie West Golf Course – Mandan
 Prairiewood Golf Course – Fargo
 Ray Richards Golf Course – Grand Forks
 Rugby Golf Club – Rugby
 Riverwood Golf Course – Bismarck
 Rose Creek Golf Course – Fargo
 Souris Valley Golf Course – Minot
 Star City Golf Course – Velva
 Tioga Golf and Country Club – Tioga
 Tom O'Leary Golf Course – Bismarck
 Valley City Town and Country Club - Valley City, North Dakota
 Watford City Golf Club – Watford City
 Westridge Golf Course – Underwood
 Williston Municipal Golf Course – Williston

References

External links
 List of North Dakota golf courses at Worldgolf.com
 Course directory at North Dakota Golf Association

List of golf courses in North Dakota
Golf courses